Frederick Thorpe (born 5 March 1954) is a Saint Lucian cricketer. He played in nine first-class and seven List A matches for the Windward Islands from 1976 to 1983.

See also
 List of Windward Islands first-class cricketers

References

External links
 

1954 births
Living people
Saint Lucian cricketers
Windward Islands cricketers